Algie Glacier is a  long glacier which flows southeast into Nimrod Glacier just west of the Nash Range of Antarctica. It was named by the New Zealand Ross Sea Committee for R.M. Algie who, as Minister in Charge of Scientific and Industrial Research, gave his strong support to the New Zealand party of the Commonwealth Trans-Antarctic Expedition, 1956–58.

See also
 List of glaciers in the Antarctic
 Glaciology

References 

Glaciers of Shackleton Coast